The spouse of the prime minister of Mauritius is the title of the wife or husband of the Prime Minister of Mauritius. To date it has been held by only 5 women, the current holder is Kobita Jugnauth.

Public role

The role of the Prime Ministerial Consort is not an official office and as such they are not given a salary or official duties, however, is still generally regarded as a public figure, frequently accompanying the prime minister on campaign and other public appearances, and often hosting dignitaries at the prime minister's residence. The spouse of the Prime Minister of Mauritius frequently participates in humanitarian and charitable work.

List of spouses of the Mauritius prime ministers

See also

 First Lady of Mauritius
 Prime Minister of Mauritius
 List of prime ministers of Mauritius

References

Mauritius
Mauritius politics-related lists